Viktor Troicki was the defending champion, but he chose to not participate this year.
Karol Beck won in the final of this tournament 7–5, 7–6(4), against host Ilija Bozoljac.

Seeds

Draw

Finals

Top half

Bottom half

External links
Main Draw
Qualifying Draw

GEMAX Open - Singles
GEMAX Open